It is very rare for snow to fall in the U.S. state of Florida, especially in the central and southern portions of the state. With the exception of the far northern areas of the state, most of the major cities in Florida have never recorded measurable snowfall, though trace  amounts have been recorded, or flurries in the air observed few times each century. According to the National Weather Service, in the Florida Keys and Key West there is no known occurrence of snow flurries since the European colonization of the region more than 300 years ago. In Miami, Fort Lauderdale, and Palm Beach there has been only one known report of snow flurries observed in the air in more than 200 years; this occurred in January 1977. In any event, Miami, Fort Lauderdale, and Palm Beach have not seen snow flurries before or since this 1977 event.

Due to Florida's low latitude and subtropical climate, temperatures low enough to support significant snowfall are infrequent and their duration is fleeting. Generally, for snow to occur, the polar jet stream must move southward through Texas and into the Gulf of Mexico, with a stalled cold front across the southern portion of the state curving northeastward to combine freezing air into the frontal clouds. While light snowfall occurs a few times each decade across the northern panhandle, most of the state is too far south of the cold continental air masses responsible for generating snowfall in the rest of the country. The mean maximum monthly snowfall in most parts of Florida is zero. The only other areas in the continental United States with this distinction are southern and southeast Texas (around McAllen and Houston) and parts of coastal southern California at low elevations.

Much of the known information on snow in Florida prior to 1900 is from climatological records provided by the National Weather Service meteorological station in Jacksonville, and information for other locations is sparse. The earliest recorded instance of snow in Florida occurred in 1774; being unaccustomed to snow, some Jacksonville residents called it "extraordinary white rain." The first White Christmas in northeastern Florida's history resulted from a snow event that occurred on December 23, 1989.

Events
The vast majority of snow events in Florida occurred in north Florida and the Jacksonville area. According to the National Weather Service, the record snowfall for the city of Jacksonville is 1.9 inches (4.8 cm), which fell on February 12, 1899. Tampa has a record snowfall of 0.2 inches (5.08 mm) which occurred on January 18, 1977.

Due to larger populations and more advanced communication networks, snow events are witnessed and reported much more frequently in recent years than in historical eras. Interpretations of this timeline must therefore be made with caution, as observed patterns may not reflect actual climate-related trends in annual snowfall but rather improved reporting. Additionally, the presence of rime or sleet being mistaken for snowflakes should also be considered. Finally, many of the reports below are not "official" National Weather Service reports, many being compiled by the newspapers and media, personal observations, and stories passed down through the years.

Pre-1900 (21 reported events)

 December 19, 1765: A "white frost" fell in the northern part of the British colony of East Florida "of short duration, and of no material detriment to the agricultural interests."
 1774: A snowstorm extended across much of the territory. The affected residents spoke of it as an "extraordinary white rain."
 January 10/11, 1800: Land surveyor Andrew Ellicott erected an observatory at Point Peter, a location near the mouth of Saint Marys River, now in the far southeast side of the City of St. Marys, Georgia. The temperature then fell below freezing, the wind shifted to northwesterly, and the skies cleared at midnight. This snowstorm perhaps extended from Louisiana to Georgia.
 February 28, 1855: A few flakes of snow fell at Jacksonville.
 January 29, 1868: Light sleet fell during the night at Jacksonville.
 February 28, 1869: During the morning, snow flurries fell at Jacksonville.
 January 10, 1873: At 7:25 am, a few snowflakes fell at Jacksonville.
 February 4/5, 1875: Between midnight and sunrise on both dates, light sleet occurred.
 December 1, 1876: According to the observer at Punta Rassa, Florida, snow fell for 5 minutes on the morning of December 1.
 January 4/5, 1879: At Jacksonville at 7 pm, sleet began, which turned to rain 90 minutes later. The freezing rain covered trees, shrubbery, and everything else outdoors by morning. The weight of the ice broke the limbs of many orange trees. At Fernandina, snow occurred.
 January 5, 1887:  of snow fell at Pensacola, and sleet fell elsewhere in the state.
 January 14, 1892:  of snow was reported at Pensacola. The first snowfall of the season occurred at Fort Barrancas. Monthly snowfall totaled  at Pensacola.
 January 17, 1892: At 10:30 am, sleet fell for a few minutes only at Madison, Florida.
 February 14, 1892: Pensacola reported  of snow.
 December 26/27, 1892: On both days, precipitation fell as sleet and snow at Pensacola.  On December 26, sleet also occurred at Cerro Gordo, Florida, and slight trace of snow fell at Tallahassee.  On December 27, a slight trace fell at Moseley Hall, Madison County, Florida. At intervals during daytime on December 27, light snow flurries occurred at Jacksonville.
 January 16–19, 1893: On January 16, snow occurred at Palatka.  On January 17, sleet fell at Oxford, and at Pensacola.  Shortly after midnight on January 18, sleet began in the city of Jacksonville and then turned to snow and then to rain.  That day, sleet also fell at Moseley Hall, Pensacola, and Tallahassee, and snow occurred at Lawtey.  On January 18 and 19, sleet fell at Bristol.
 December 29, 1894: Brooksville reported snowfall from 9 am to 11 am, and a few flakes fell at Mosquito Lagoon near Oak Hill, Florida.  The press reported snow at towns in middle and west Florida. The temperature morning fell to lows unprecedented in decades, and this freeze destroyed 2 million to 3 million boxes of not yet gathered oranges, severely damaged pineapple plants, and killed or destroyed almost all other fruits and vegetables.
 February 14, 1895: From 6:22 pm to 6:27 pm, light sleet fell at Jacksonville, followed by light snow until 6:32 pm.  At 7:20 pm, light snow resumed until 8 pm.  Snow also fell at Tampa, and at Pensacola, snow reportedly reached depths allowing for sleighing.
 February 12/13, 1899: At 9:45 pm, rain changed to sleet at Jacksonville. The accumulation reached  at Lake Butler. In sheltered locations, the snow melted only several days later. This Great Blizzard of 1899 also affected much of the rest of the American South, and even brought the only ever subzero temperature to Florida.

20th century (21 reported events)
 December 16, 1901: At 1 pm, light snow fell at Jacksonville; at intervals through the afternoon, sleet followed.
 February 7, 1907: During the afternoon, a light snow flurry occurred "in the immediate vicinity" of the city of Jacksonville.
 November 27, 1912: An overnight period of snow covers the ground and trees with a  layer in northern Florida.
 January 22/23, 1935: Snow falls until the next morning, with Pensacola recording .
 December 14, 1952: Sleet and snow falls across the northern portion of the state, though there is very little accumulation.
 December 14, 1953: Light sleet occurs in the morning in Marianna.
 March 6, 1954:  of snow accumulates at Milton Experimental Station, Santa Rosa County, within a 24-hour period, the highest such total for Florida according to official modern records.
To this date, this is the only instance of snowfall in Florida occurring after the spring equinox.
 December 12–13, 1957: It reaches even South Florida, although with less intensity than in other portions. Spanning south of Miami-Dade County, though it does not reach the inhabited coastal areas.
Additionally, Tallahassee reports a record .
 January 18, 1977: The pressure gradient between a strong ridge over the Mississippi Valley and a Nor'easter over Atlantic Canada sends very cold temperatures southward into the state. Areas around Pensacola are the first to receive the snow, then the rest of the Panhandle. Pensacola accumulates  of snow. Before sunrise on January 19, West Palm Beach reports snow flurries in the air for the first and only time on record, with snow flurries reaching as far south as Homestead. The snow causes little impact as it was of the dry variety, melting on contact and lasting less than 40 minutes. Cold air results in hundreds of millions of dollars in damage to the winter citrus industry (Orlando ties the 1899 record of more than six consecutive nights well-below freezing). On January 20, The Miami Herald reports the event as the front-page story, with a headline of a size usually reserved for the declaration of war.
 January 30, 1977: Pensacola receives a small amount of snow.
 March 2, 1980: About  of snow covers car tops and patio furniture in Jacksonville.
 March 1, 1986:  of snow accumulates overnight in Jacksonville before melting within 30 minutes due to the morning sun.
 December 23/24, 1989: Light rain in Jacksonville turns to freezing rain as temperatures drop, and later changes to snow. The snow totals several inches in some locations, and results in the first White Christmas in the city's history. Light snow falls across central Florida as far south as southern Pinellas County on the 23rd, though the official weather station in St. Petersburg experiences only a light sleet.
 January 8, 1996: Snow flurries are reported from Crystal River to New Port Richey with no accumulation.
 December 18, 1996: A plume of cold air causes snow to form in the northwestern portion of Escambia County.

21st century (29 reported events)

 January 24, 2003: A plume of Arctic air produces widespread record low temperatures and light snow flurries along the eastern coastline. The snow is described as ocean-effect snow, identical to lake effect snow in that it occurs due to very cold air passing over relatively warm water temperatures. Snow flurries are reported in the air as far south as Fort Pierce.
 December 25, 2004: Locations along the Florida Panhandle receive a dusting of snow.
 November 21, 2006: An eastward-moving weather system produces a very light dusting and snowflakes in central Florida. It is the first snow in November in the state since 1912.
 February 3, 2007: Very light snow flurries are reported in the northeastern panhandle, lasting less than an hour.
 January 3, 2008: Light snow flurries are reported near Daytona Beach.
 January 8/9, 2010: Very light dusting of snow seen in the eastern Jacksonville area. Light snow also fell in parts of central Florida, which briefly accumulated in Ocala and other parts of Marion County. A "wintry mix" of sleet and freezing rain was widespread, with reports of light snow across central Florida from Tampa to Orlando to Melbourne.
 January 10, 2010:  An Arctic cold front blasted through south Florida on New Year’s Day, ushering in a period of record-setting cold temperatures. West Palm Beach, Naples and Moore Haven set records for their coldest 12-day stretch on record, with Fort Lauderdale and Miami not far behind. The coldest temperatures since 1989 were observed across most areas on January 10, which followed a day of rain with temperatures in the 30s and 40s (as well as a few unconfirmed reports of sleet and snow).
 February 12, 2010: Portions of northwestern Florida experience snowfall totals of around 1 in (25 mm).
 February 14, 2010:  of snow fell across the northern halves of Escambia, Santa Rosa, Walton and Okaloosa Counties.
 December 8, 2010: Snow mixed with rain is reported in western parts of the panhandle, north of Pensacola.
 December 26, 2010: A mix of snow and sleet was reported in Jacksonville by the National Weather Service.
 December 28, 2010: Light snow was reported at Tampa Executive Airport in eastern Hillsborough County at 01:00 and 05:00 local time, following a rare freezing fog event around midnight.
 January 9, 2011: Sleet is reported in the Pensacola area, as well as other places in Escambia and Santa Rosa counties. There was no accumulation.
 March 3, 2013: Snow flurries were reported in the Panhandle, specifically around Panama City Beach
 January 24–25, 2014: Sleet and light snow are reported in Escambia, Santa Rosa, and Okaloosa counties. Very light sleet is reported at a few locations around Jacksonville.
 January 28–29, 2014: A major winter storm event resulted in a mixture of freezing rain (with ice accumulation), sleet, and snow across most of the Panhandle between the afternoon of the 28th and morning of the 29th. Due to dangerous ice accumulation, the Florida Highway Patrol and FDOT closed several bridges in the Panhandle and advised against non-essential travel. Many state and local government offices were closed around mid-day on the 28th. In Santa Rosa county, officials cautioned that ice-laden tree limbs were hanging low enough to hit vehicles. Between 1 and 9:30 PM on the 28th, 21,633 Gulf Power customers lost power at some point. Pensacola received  of snow on January 28. Pensacola International Airport closed at 9:17 PM January 28 and was not scheduled to reopen until late on the 29th.
January 8, 2015: Snow flurries are reported in various locations around Jacksonville. The event is attributed to ocean-effect snow.
January 22–23, 2016: Snow flurries are reported along the Florida Panhandle, as far east as the Jacksonville area, and as far south as the Gainesville area.
January 6–7, 2017: Periods of Light Snow and Wintry mix occurred in Escambia County around 9 PM and ending just after Midnight January 7. There was no accumulation reported.
March 16, 2017: Snow flurries fell in parts of the Florida Panhandle, including Tallahassee. This occurred for less than 1 hour starting at 3:53 am, but had no accumulation.
December 8–9, 2017: Snow falls in various locations in the western Florida Panhandle. Snow flurries were reported in Destin and Miramar Beach.
January 2–3, 2018: A winter storm resulted in snow and a wintry mix (freezing rain, sleet, and ice) across northern Florida from Tallahassee to the outskirts of Jacksonville and as far south as Gainesville, with temperatures in the 20s and dewpoints in the teens in the morning. A winter storm warning was in effect on the morning of January 3 for Nassau, Baker, Union, Columbia, Gilchrist, Suwanee, Hamilton, Lafayette, Madison, Taylor, Jefferson, and Leon Counties, prompting several school districts to cancel classes on January 3. Tallahassee received 0.10-0.20 in of snow, which was the first measurable snowfall in the city since December 1989 (it sees flurries every few years). The Tallahassee snowfall followed a couple hours of freezing rain. The Florida Highway Patrol closed Interstate 10 from Tallahassee to Madison for most of the morning of January 3 as well as several bridges in North-Central Florida that had accumulated a dangerous amount of ice. Recorded ice accumulations included 0.25 in in Hilliard and Lake City and 0.10 in in Perry.
January 17, 2018: A wintry mix of freezing rain and sleet, and some areas of snow is observed in portions of the Florida Panhandle. Snow fell in Crestview and DeFuniak Springs while freezing rain fell in Fort Walton Beach. Pensacola saw sleet which accumulated on grass and vehicles. The Bob Sikes Bridge to Pensacola Beach was closed due to ice.
January 22, 2020: There were reports of graupel in the South Florida area spanning across coastal Palm Beach and Broward Counties and the Treasure Coast through the afternoon into the evening hours. Cold air on top of the relatively warmer waters of the Atlantic Ocean created instability and some updrafts that sent water droplets higher up into the freezing part of the atmosphere. Those water droplets froze to become snowflakes high above the surface and, accumulating frozen water droplets on their surface, become heavy enough to fall to the ground as graupel.
February 16, 2021: Scattered light flurries were reported in Escambia County via mPing. No accumulation was reported.
January 3, 2022: Light snow was reported in the early morning hours across Walton County in the Florida Panhandle.
January 16, 2022: Light flurries were reported at 6:40 am CST in McDavid, Florida. Additional light snow flurries were reported throughout the morning in northern Escambia and Santa Rosa counties. Minor accumulations on grassy surfaces were reported in the far northern part of Escambia County.
January 21, 2022: Light freezing rain and freezing drizzle occurred during the morning of January 21, 2022, across the northwestern Florida Panhandle. The National Weather Service in Mobile, Alabama issued a winter weather advisory the previous day to highlight this threat. Minimal impacts were observed.
December 25, 2022: A historic winter storm produced a cold wave of Arctic air across the United States, resulting in the occurrence of sleet mid-morning on Christmas Day in the areas of Rockledge, Viera, and Merritt Island in northern Brevard County, Florida.

See also
 Climate of Florida
 Climate of the Tampa Bay area
 Great Blizzard of 1899
 Cold wave of January 1977
 1993 Storm of the Century
 January 2018 North American blizzard
 Snow in Louisiana

References

Climate of Florida
Florida
Weather-related lists